Dnestr radar and Dnepr radar, both known by the NATO reporting name Hen House are the first generation of Soviet space surveillance and early warning radars. Six radars of this type were built around the periphery of the Soviet Union starting in the 1960s to provide ballistic missile warnings for attacks from different directions. They were the primary Soviet early warning radars for much of the later Cold War. In common with other Soviet and Russian early warning radars they are named after rivers, the Dnestr and the Dnepr.

The Dnestr/Dnepr radars were intended to be replaced by the newer Daryal radars starting in the 1990s. Only two of the planned Daryal radars became operational, due to issues such as the dissolution of the Soviet Union. As of 2012, the Russian early warning network still consists of some radars of this vintage. It is likely that all the existing radars will be replaced by the third generation Voronezh radars by 2020.

TsSO-P
The Dnestr radar came from work on ballistic missile defence undertaken in the late 1950s and early 1960s. System A, the prototype for the A-35 anti-ballistic missile system, was set up in the Sary Shagan testing grounds, in the Kazakh SSR. Work on the system was led by design bureau KB-1 which proposed using VHF radar RTN and the Dunay-2 UHF radar. Other alternatives were sought from Soviet industry and RTI proposed using VHF radar TsSO-P and UHF radar  TsSS-30.

TsSO-P (standing for  meaning central detection station – test site) was selected for further development, together with the Dunay-2. It had an array with an open ribbed structure and used 200 microseconds pulses. Hardware methods were designed for signal processing as the intended M-4 computer could not run. It first detected an object on 17 September 1961.

TsSO-P took part in the 1961 and 1962 Soviet Project K nuclear tests above the Sary Shagan range to examine the effects of high altitude nuclear explosions on missile defence hardware.

Dnestr

TsSO-P was effective at satellite tracking and was chosen as the radar of the Istrebitel Sputnikov (IS) anti-satellite programme. The two sites chosen were at the village of Mishelevka near Irkutsk in Siberia, which was called OS-1, and at Cape Gulshad on Lake Balkhash near Sary Shagan, which was called OS-2. Each site received four Dnestr radar systems in a fan arrangement.

A Dnestr radar was composed of two TsSO-P radar wings joined together by a two-story building containing a joint computer system and command post. Each radar wing covered a 30-degree sector with a 0.5 degree scanning beam. The elevation scanning pattern was a 'spade' with a width of 20 degrees. The radar systems were arranged to create a fan shaped barrier. Of the four radars, called cells ( roughly radio location cell), two faced to the west and two faced to the east. All scanned between +10 degrees and +90 degrees in elevation.

Construction at the two sites started between 1962 and 1963 with improvements in the TsSO-P test model being fed back into the deployed units. They gained an M-4 2-M computer with semiconductors, although the rest of the radar used Vacuum tubes. The radar systems were completed in late 1966 with the fourth Dnestr at Balkhash being used for testing. In 1968 the Dnepropetrovsk Sputnik target satellite, DS-P1-Yu, was used to test the ability of the system.

The Dnestr radars were accepted for service by the Soviet Air Defence Forces in April 1967 and became part of the space surveillance network SKKP.

Dnestr-M
Parallel with the implementation of the Dnestr space surveillance units, a modified version of the original Dnestr units, Dnestr-M radar, was being developed to act as an early warning radar to identify attacks by ballistic missiles. The first two were built at Murmansk in northern Russia (Olenegorsk – RO-1) and near Riga in the then Latvian SSR (Skrunda – RO-2). They constituted the beginning of the Soviet SPRN network, the equivalent of the NATO BMEWS.

The first Dnestr-M at Olenegorsk was completed by 1968. In 1970, the radars at Olenegorsk and Skrunda, and an associated command centre at Solnechnogorsk, were accepted for service. According to Podvig (2002), it seems they were positioned to identify missile launches from NATO submarines in the Norwegian and North Seas.

The Dnestr-M included many improvements over the previous versions such as an increase in the pulse length from 200μs to 800μs which increased the range of objects identified, more semiconductors, and many other scanning and processing changes.

A version of this radar was built at the Sary Shagan test site and was called TsSO-PM. After this had completed tests in 1965 it was decided to upgrade nodes 1 and 2 of the two OS sites to Dnestr-M, keeping nodes 3 and 4 as Dnestr. These radars remained as space surveillance radars which scanned between +10 and +90 degrees, comparative to scanning between +10 and +30 degrees for the missile warning radars. A space surveillance network of four Dnestrs and four Dnestr-Ms, and two command posts was formally commissioned in 1971.

Dnepr
Work to improve the radar continued. An improved array was designed which covered 60 degrees rather than 30. The first Dnepr radar was built at Balkhash as a new radar, cell 5. It entered service on 12 May 1974. The second was a new early warning station at Sevastopol. New Dneprs were also built at Mishelevka and another at Skrunda, and then one at Mukachevo. The remaining radars were all converted to Dnepr with the exception of cells 3 and 4 at Balkhash and Mishelevka which remained space surveillance radars.

All current operational radars are described as Dnepr, and have been updated incrementally.

Technical details
Each Dnepr array is a double sectoral horn antenna 250m long by 12 m wide. It has two rows of slot radiators within two waveguides. At each end of the two arrays, there is a set of transmitting and receiving equipment. It emits a signal covering a sector 30 degrees in azimuth and 30 degrees in elevation, with the scanning controlled by frequency. Four sets mean the radar covers 120 degrees in azimuth and 30 degrees in elevation (5 to 35 degrees). 

The Dnepr involved the horn antenna being reduced from 20 to 14 metres in height and the addition of a polarising filter

Current status

These radars have been installed at six different radar stations and as of 2012 are operational at three – Balkhash, Mishelevka and Olenegorsk. The 1972 Anti-Ballistic Missile Treaty required that early warning radars were located on the periphery of national territory and faced outwards. This caused problems when the Soviet Union collapsed in 1991 as many of the radar stations were now in newly independent states. The first station to close was Skrunda, in newly independent Latvia. A 1994 agreement between Russia and Latvia agreed that the two Dnepr radars there would stop working in 1998, and would be fully demolished by 2000.

Russia signed an agreement with Ukraine in 1992 allowing it to continue using the Dnepr radars at Sevastopol and Mukachevo. The stations were run by Ukrainian personnel and data was sent to the headquarters of the Russian early warning system in Solnechnogorsk. In 2008 Russia announced that it was pulling out of the agreement with Ukraine and that the last data given to Russia from the stations would be in 2009. The Ukrainian government announced that the stations were to be used part-time for space surveillance.

The remaining stations in Russia and abroad are being replaced by the Voronezh radar. The Dneprs in Mishelevka, Irkutsk will close once the second array of the new Voronezh radar is operational. The Dnepr at Olenegorsk, Murmansk will be replaced by a Voronezh as well. It is planned to start construction there in 2017.

Notes

References

External links

Set of photos from inside the Balkhash Dnepr from Novosti Kosmonavtiki, July 2009  
Set of photos of an Irkutsk Dnepr from Novosti Kosmonavtiki, May 2012 

Russian Space Forces
Russian and Soviet military radars
Radar networks
Military equipment introduced in the 1960s